Gerald M. Hayle was an Australian film director and screenwriter. He made a number of industrial movies in Melbourne before moving into feature films in the late 1920s. None of his films were successful commercially.

Filmography
Environment (1927)
The Rushing Tide (1927)
Tiger Island (1930)

References

External links
Gerald M. Hayle at AustLit

Australian film directors
Year of birth missing
Year of death missing